Santiago Botero Echeverry (born October 27, 1972) is a Colombian former professional road bicycle racer. He was a pro from 1996 to 2010, during which time he raced in three editions of the Tour de France and four editions of the Vuelta a España (the Tour of Spain). He was best known for winning the mountains classification in the Tour de France, and the World Championship Time Trial.

Biography

Beginnings 

Since childhood, he was very fond of bicycles, especially after his father, Alberto Botero, gave him a mountain bike, with which he practiced and began to compete in mountain bike races in Medellín. Although he was not a good academic student, he became one of the most important cyclists in Colombia.

Juan Darío Uribe, the sports doctor who discovered him and was his mentor in road cycling, says that he gave him the same effort test given to his other runners (some of them were Óscar de Jesús Vargas, Carlos Mario Jaramillo and Juan Diego Ramírez) on a stationary bike. The results were incredible. These pro riders hit 600 watts of power and nearly passed out. Santiago looked like a robot at this point in the test and hardly felt tired. “I realized that he had special conditions. None of the thousands of athletes from Indeportes Antioquia that he had studied showed such a level of strength,” said Dr. Uribe.

Uribe insisted that Botero should train in Europe and not in Colombia, so Santiago decided to go to that continent to make his professional debut in 1996 with the Spanish team Kelme.

Career 
He was, for the greater part of his career, a member of the  team, but in 2003 joined . His performances as part of the Kelme dissipated in Team Telekom, with the team management blaming his lack of discipline in training, but he claimed health problems.

He lives in both Colombia and Madrid, Spain with his wife. Botero joined the American domestic team, for the 2008 season. Botero finished his professional career riding for the Colombian team . He was also previously the manager of UCI Continental team .

Results 
Born in Medellín, Colombia, Botero was the World Champion in the individual time trial in 2002.  His career highlights include a stage win in the Vuelta a Andalucía in 1999, a stage win in the Paris–Nice in 1999, a stage win in the 2000 Tour de France, the mountains classification in the 2000 Tour de France, two stage wins in the Vuelta 2001, the third place in the World Championships in the individual time trial in 2001 and two stage wins and fourth place overall in the 2002 Tour de France.  Other victories include a stage win in the Clasica Bogota in 1997, a prologue win in the Vuelta a Chile in 1997 and a stage win in GP Mitsubishi in 1998. After joining T-Mobile his accomplishments in the Tour diminished sharply.

On May 1, 2005 he won the Tour de Romandie in Switzerland, 33 seconds ahead of rising Italian star and favorite for the Giro d'Italia Damiano Cunego.  Romandie is often used as a preparation race for the Giro d'Italia. Botero carried that form into the 2005 edition of the Critérium du Dauphiné Libéré when he won the individual time trial ahead of Americans Levi Leipheimer and Lance Armstrong as well as winning the mountainous sixth stage which brought him into second overall in the general classification.

On February 28, 2007, Botero was presented with his new team UNE Orbitel in Bogota, Colombia. He outlined that his ambitions for the year would be to win the Vuelta a Colombia, to be the Colombian national champion and a podium place in the UCI World championships individual time trial event. In August, Botero won the Vuelta a Colombia for the first time in his career. He dominated the event by winning the prologue and two stages along the way as well as wearing the leaders jersey for most of the race.

Doping allegations 
In 2006, Team Phonak dropped him on June 2 after he was named in media reports in the massive Operación Puerto  doping probe in Spain, this just weeks before the start of the 2006 Tour de France. On October 2, 2006, Botero was cleared by the disciplinary committee of the Federación Colombiana de Ciclismo (Colombian Cycling Federation).

Retirement 

Botero retired from his professional carrer in 2010 and that same year was awarded by Coldeportes as one of the most outstanding sportspersons in Colombia.

The Colombian cyclist was 38 at the time of his retirement, working as a professional for 15 years, which has made him one of the best athletes in his country.

Botero is a business administrator graduated from Eafit University, in his country. He also studied service management at the University of Medellín.

Career achievements

Major results

1998
 4th Overall Tour de Romandie
 8th Overall Vuelta a La Rioja
1999
 2nd Overall Vuelta a Andalucía
 3rd Overall Paris–Nice
1st Stage 4
 4th Overall Setmana Catalana de Ciclisme 
 5th Overall Volta a la Comunitat Valenciana 
2000
 7th Overall Tour de France
1st  Mountains classification
1st Stage 14
2001
 1st Clásica a los Puertos de Guadarrama 
 Vuelta a España
1st Stages 7 (ITT) & 21 (ITT)
 3rd  Time trial, UCI Road World Championships
 8th Overall Tour de France
 9th Classique des Alpes 
2002
 1st  Time trial, UCI Road World Championships
 1st Classique des Alpes 
 1st Stage 16 Vuelta a España
 1st Stage 3 (ITT) Critérium du Dauphiné Libéré
 4th Overall Tour de France
1st Stages 9 (ITT) & 15
2003
 3rd Overall Clásica Internacional de Alcobendas
 4th Overall Vuelta a Asturias
2004
 7th Time trial, Olympic Games
2005
 1st  Overall Tour de Romandie
1st Stage 5 (ITT)
 2nd Overall Critérium du Dauphiné Libéré
1st Stages 3 (ITT) & 6
2006
 2nd Overall Volta a Catalunya
2007
 1st  Time trial, National Road Championships
 1st  Overall Vuelta a Colombia
1st Prologue, Stages 6 & 14 (ITT)
 2008
 1st Prologue Vuelta a Colombia
 6th Road race, Olympic Games
2009
 1st  Time trial, National Road Championships
 1st Stage 7 (ITT) Vuelta a Colombia
 2010
 5th Overall Tour de San Luis

Grand Tour general classification results timeline

References

External links

1972 births
Living people
Colombian Tour de France stage winners
Cyclists at the 1999 Pan American Games
Cyclists at the 2000 Summer Olympics
Cyclists at the 2004 Summer Olympics
Cyclists at the 2007 Pan American Games
Cyclists at the 2008 Summer Olympics
Olympic cyclists of Colombia
UCI Road World Champions (elite men)
Vuelta a Colombia stage winners
Sportspeople from Medellín
Colombian Vuelta a España stage winners
Pan American Games medalists in cycling
Pan American Games gold medalists for Colombia
Colombian male cyclists
Colombian Tour de Romandie stage winners
South American Games gold medalists for Colombia
South American Games medalists in cycling
Competitors at the 2010 South American Games
Medalists at the 2007 Pan American Games